William Paris (29 April 1838 – 12 January 1915) was an English first-class cricketer. Paris was a right-handed batsman who was a right-arm roundarm bowler.

Paris made his first-class debut for Hampshire in 1875 against Kent. Paris made five first-class appearances for Hampshire from 1875 to 1876. His final County match came against Kent.

Paris returned in 1881 to play for Hampshire in a first-class match against the Marylebone Cricket Club. This was to be Paris' final first-class match for the club. Paris scored 81 runs for the club at an average of 8.10. Paris scored a single half century that yielded his highest score of 51*. With his roundarm bowling Paris took five wickets at an average of 10.40, with best figures of 3/28 on debut against Kent.

In 1878 Paris stood as an Umpire in first-class match between Hampshire and Kent.

Paris died in Winchester, Hampshire on 12 January 1915.

External links
William Paris at Cricinfo
William Paris at CricketArchive

1838 births
1915 deaths
People from Alresford
English cricketers
Hampshire cricketers
English cricket umpires